Balgarene is a village in Lovech Municipality, Lovech Province, northern Bulgaria.

Revolutionary Tinko Simov was from the village.

References

Villages in Lovech Province